Seven Seas Voyager is a cruise ship for Regent Seven Seas Cruises headquartered in Miami, Florida. She entered service in 2003. Every cabin on board is a suite with a balcony. In 2006, a Forbes.com article listed the Asia leg of the Voyager'''s world cruise as the most expensive cruise in the Asia region.

 Incidents 
 2010 accident 
On 14 March 2010, as Seven Seas Voyager sailed out of Victoria Harbour in Hong Kong, it hit the back of a Star Ferry, known as Twinkling Star, and caused minor damage to the ferry. No one was injured.

 2013 incident 
On 3 February 2013, Jackie Kastrinelis, of Groveland, Massachusetts, was found dead inside her cabin on the Seven Seas Voyager in Darwin Harbour, Australia. The 24-year-old woman had been a crew member since 2011 and was the lead singer in the ship's musical show. Mysterious circumstances surround Jackie's death, including a head injury the night before during a rehearsal, medication given by a doctor on the ship, and romantic relationships with a few crew members. The official reasoning behind the death of Jackie Kastrinelis was "sudden unexplained death syndrome".

 2018 pier allision 
The evening of September 25, 2018 the Seven Seas Voyager'' was sailing from the port of Civitavecchia (Rome, Italy) when strong winds caused the vessel to suffer a pier allision. The vessel came to a halt shortly thereafter and remained tied up in the port overnight to assess damage. The damage was determined to be largely cosmetic and the vessel continued its itinerary although the incident caused it to miss the scheduled port of Sorrento, Italy. Temporary cosmetic repairs were completed in the port of Koeper, Croatia before the cruise came to its scheduled conclusion at the port of Venice, Italy.

References

External links

 Seven Seas Voyager at Regent Seven Seas Cruises website.

Cruise ships
2003 ships
Ships built by T. Mariotti
Ships built in Genoa